Prince Rong of the First Rank, or simply Prince Rong, was the title of a princely peerage used in China during the Manchu-led Qing dynasty (1644–1912). As the Prince Rong peerage was not awarded "iron-cap" status, this meant that each successive bearer of the title would normally start off with a title downgraded by one rank vis-à-vis that held by his predecessor. However, the title would generally not be downgraded to any lower than a feng'en fuguo gong except under special circumstances.

The first bearer of the title was Yongqi (1741–1766), the fifth son of the Qianlong Emperor. In 1765, he was awarded the status of a qinwang (prince of the first rank) by his father under the title "Prince Rong of the First Rank". The title was passed down over seven generations and was held by nine persons.

"Prince Rong" may also refer the Shunzhi Emperor's unnamed fourth son (1657–1658), who died as an infant and was given the posthumous title "Prince Rong of the First Rank".

Members of the Prince Rong peerage
 Yongqi (1741–1766), the Qianlong Emperor's fifth son, posthumously honoured as Prince Rongchun of the First Rank (榮純親王)
 Mianyi (綿億; 1764–1815), Yongqi's fifth son, initially a beile from 1784 to 1799, promoted to junwang in 1799, posthumously honoured as Prince Rongke of the Second Rank (榮恪郡王)
 Yihui (奕繪; 1799–1838), Mianyi's eldest son, held a beile title from 1815 to 1838
 Zaijun (載鈞; 1818–1857), Yihui's eldest son, held a beizi title from 1838 to 1857
 Pumei (溥楣; 1844–1894), Zaichuan's eldest son and Zaijun's adoptive son, held the title of a feng'en zhenguo gong from 1857 to 1866, stripped of his title in 1866
 Zaizhao (載釗; 1825–1881), Yihui's second son, held the title of a fuguo jiangjun from 1844 to 1881, posthumously honoured as a feng'en zhenguo gong in 1881
 Puyun (溥芸; 1850–1902), Zaizhao's third son, held the title of a feng'en zhenguo gong from 1866 to 1902
 Yumin (毓敏; 1878–1912), Puyun's second son, held the title of a feng'en zhenguo gong from 1902 to 1912
 Hengxu (1899–1966), better known as Jin Guangping, Yujian's son and Yumin's adoptive son, held the title of a feng'en zhenguo gong from 1912 to 1945
 Puchang (溥菖), Zaizhao's ninth son, held the title of a third class fengguo jiangjun
 Zaichu (載初; 1832–1881), Yihui's fourth son, held the title of a fuguo jiangjun from 1857 to 1862

Family tree

See also
 Royal and noble ranks of the Qing dynasty

References
 

Qing dynasty princely peerages
Peerages of the Bordered Red Banner